Doha is a seaside district of Kuwait City in Kuwait. It comprises seven blocks.

See also
Doha Port (Kuwait)

References

Suburbs of Kuwait City